The 1998 Campeonato Nacional, known as Campeonato Nacional Copa Banco del Estado 1998 for sponsorship purposes, was the 67th season of top-flight football in Chile. Colo-Colo won their 22nd title following a 2–1 home win against Deportes Iquique on 13 December. Universidad Católica also qualified for the next Copa Libertadores as Liguilla winners.

Standings

Results

Topscorers

Liguilla Pre-Copa Libertadores

Semifinals

Finals 

Universidad Católica qualified for the 1999 Copa Libertadores

Promotion/relegation play-offs

See also
1998 Copa Apertura

Notes

References
RSSSF Page
national-football-teams

Primera División de Chile seasons
Chile
1998 in Chilean football